is a railway station on the Fujikyuko Line in the city of Fujiyoshida, Yamanashi, Japan, operated by the private railway operator Fuji Kyuko (Fujikyu).

Lines

Station layout

The station is unstaffed, and consists of one side platform serving a single bidirectional track, with the station structure located on the south side of the track. It has a waiting room but no toilet facilities.

Adjacent stations

History
Kotobuki Station opened on 19 June 1929, initially named .

Passenger statistics
In fiscal 1998, the station was used by an average of 518 passengers daily.

Surrounding area

 Fujimidai Junior High School
 Fuji Elementary School
 Chūō Expressway

See also
 List of railway stations in Japan

References

External links

 Fujikyuko station information 

Railway stations in Yamanashi Prefecture
Railway stations in Japan opened in 1929
Stations of Fuji Kyuko
Fujiyoshida